Pierre-Joseph Buc'hoz (27 January 1731, in Metz – 13 January 1807, in Paris) was a French physician, lawyer and naturalist.

Buc'hoz become a doctor of medicine in Nancy in 1763. He was devoted to botany, but was also interested in the treatment of melancholy and recommended music as therapy. He travelled throughout his native Lorraine and published a 13-volume  of the province. Author of many works of botany he also studied  animals (in particular birds) and minerals.

Partial list of publications
 .
 . Lacombe, Paris 1768 (Digital edition by the University and State Library Düsseldorf)
 , 1770.
 , 1774.
 , 1775.
  . Felßeker, Nürnberg 1777 Digital edition by the University and State Library Düsseldorf
 , Paris: chez l'auteur, 1781.
 , Paris: chez l'auteur, 1782.
 , Paris: chez l'auteur, 1783.
 , 1785.
 .

References

Larousse, P. 1865-1876 Grand Dict. du XIX. Siècle
Rose, H. J. 1850 New General Biographical Dictionary.

External links
 Gallica Downloads of Herbier ou collection des plantes médicinales de la Chine and L'art alimentaire
 irc forumları

French naturalists
18th-century French botanists
French entomologists
French ornithologists
1731 births
1807 deaths